Yang Fan (born 16 October 1987) is a former Chinese weightlifter, and world champion competing in the −62 kg division.

Major results

References

1987 births
Living people
Chinese male weightlifters
World Weightlifting Championships medalists
21st-century Chinese people